Of Blessings And Burdens (frequently abbreviated using the acronym OBAB) was an American five-piece post-hardcore band based out of Amherst, Massachusetts, United States. Jack Strong and Ryan Tyree, the band's bassist and guitarist, respectively, came up with the name "Of Blessings and Burdens" and the name stuck, due to it reflecting their lyrics, their personal feelings, and what the band felt they were about. OBAB formed in 2003 and weathered a series lineup changes, eventually disbanding in 2006.  During that time, they shared the stage with such bands as Unearth, Shadows Fall, The Acacia Strain, Ligeia and NORA.

History
The band was formed by Ryan Tyree and Jack Strong under the name "Substatic".  Tyree ended up substituting Strong's class one day, and the topic of music was brought up. The pair decided to form a Band. Strong had a friend he grew up with, Chris Richardson, who played Drums.  He asked him to join and a trio, Substatic, was started.  During that period they went through different lead Guitarists until they played a gig with the Band Seven Day Descent, where they found Dave Marcus and asked him to join, which he did.  Shortly thereafter the Band changed its name to "Of Blessings And Burdens".  About a year or two later Preston Bailey from the band  Art is Lost was added to the line up.  He replaced Dave on Guitar, and Dave became the band's lead Vocalist.  Shortly after this, Tyree ended up leaving the band---on good terms---to focus on his teaching career.  He currently works in Hathaway Dorm in the Williston Northampton School. He teaches English and coaches Squash and Tennis. He still is in communication with the members of the Band, and still plays Guitar frequently. He is often known as the "Rock star" of the teachers, as he is many students' favorite teacher. For a while they played as a four-piece until they put out an ad saying that they were seeking a Guitarist, and Jeff Sabola answered. Later Strong quit to join The Acacia Strain, and was replaced by Hiroya Kinuta. In 2006, Of Blessings And Burdens disbanded. The following year, the band said they would regroup for a final concert with the original lineup, but with Bailey on guitar instead of Ryan Tyree.  A few practices took place but the reunion show was called off.

Jack Strong remains the bassist for The Acacia Strain. Dave Marcus and Preston moved on to play for the band Arrows Over Athens. Chris Richardson and Ryan Tyree now play in Lake Side Drive, an 1980s cover band.

After a year of talk about a reunion, rumors spread of an Of Blessings And Burdens reunion show with the bands antilove, The Bloodening, Good Luck Cadet, November 5, 1955, There Was Change, and more.  The show took place at the Waterfront Tavern in Holyoke Massachusetts February 10, 2008. It was later confirmed that the band never agreed to play the show, and in fact didn't end up playing. Some miscommunication took place between the show's producers and the members of OBAB.

In March 2008, Dave Marcus moved to California due to personal reasons. Marcus returned to Massachusetts in March 2009 and began re-recording the band's last release, To the Ones We Love: A True Story.  A new version of the song "Find Your Own Wings" was released on the band's Myspace page. The album was released online in early July 2010.

On May 22, 2012, Marcus died unexpectedly at his home in Sunderland, Massachusetts. He was 24 years old.

Members
Dave Marcus - Vocals/Guitar
Chris Richardson - Drums
Jeff Sabola - Guitar
Preston Bailey - Guitar
Hiroya Kinuta - Bass

Ex-members
Ryan Tyree - Vocals/Guitar
Jack Strong - Bass
 Josh Mann - Vocals/Guitar

Discography

Videography
Music Videos:
Never Bled Like This - (2005)
Between Scylla And Charybdis - (2005)
Webisodes:
Adventures In OBABLand
Adventures In Maine
New Video - Hiro!
Recording/Van
Hot Wings!!!
OBAB Tour Footage 1
OBAB Tour Footage 2
OBAB Tour Footage 3

References

External links
 Of Blessings And Burdens Myspace
 To The Ones We Love (OFFICIAL DOWNLOAD)

Punk rock groups from Massachusetts
American post-hardcore musical groups